The list of parties to the Partial Test Ban Treaty encompasses the states who have signed and ratified or acceded to the international agreement prohibiting all test detonations of nuclear weapons except underground.

On August 5, 1963, the Partial Test Ban Treaty (PTBT) was opened for signature. The principal state authors (the Soviet Union, the United Kingdom, and the United States) signed the treaty that day. The PTBT came into force and closed for signature on October 10, 1963 with the ratification by the three principal states. Since then, states that did not sign the treaty can now only accede or succeed to it.

As of October 2018, 125 UN member states have ratified or acceded to the treaty, most recently Montenegro on 3 June 2006. A further 10 states have signed but not ratified the treaty. The instrument of ratification, accession, or succession is deposited at the respective capitals of the principal states of the treaty: Moscow, London, and Washington, D.C.

Ratified or acceded states

Multiple dates indicate the different days in which states submitted their signature or deposition, which varied by location.  This location is noted by: (L) for London, (M) for Moscow, and (W) for Washington.

Notes

Partially recognized state abiding by treaty
The ROC has committed itself to continue to adhere to the requirements of the treaty, and the United States has declared that they still consider them to be "bound by its obligations".

Signatory states
The following ten states have signed but not ratified the treaty.

Non-signatory states
The remaining UN member states and UN observer states, which have not signed the treaty, are:

See also 

 List of parties to the Biological Weapons Convention
 List of parties to the Chemical Weapons Convention
 List of parties to the Convention on Certain Conventional Weapons
 List of parties to the Comprehensive Nuclear-Test-Ban Treaty
 List of parties to the Ottawa Treaty
 List of parties to the Treaty on the Non-Proliferation of Nuclear Weapons
 List of parties to the Treaty on the Prohibition of Nuclear Weapons

References

External links
Limited Test Ban Treaty at the U.S. Department of State

Arms control treaties
Cold War treaties
Nuclear weapons policy
Lists of parties to treaties